Asaudha (also known as Asoudha) is a village located in Jhajjar district in the Indian state of Haryana. Asoudha Siwan and Asoudha Todran are nearby villages.

Religion
Most of the residents are Hindu, with Jats being the dominant social group. Dada Budha Mandir is a temple frequented by pilgrims in bhadrapad mas.

References 

Villages in Jhajjar district